Paraflabellina ischitana is a species of sea slug, an aeolid nudibranch, a marine gastropod mollusk in the family Flabellinidae.

Etymology
The name ischitana means from Ischia, the island from where this nudibranch was first named.

Distribution

This species is found in Mediterranean waters around Spain in such locations as Costa Brava, and in the Tyrrhenian Sea, especially around Ischia (hence the species Latin name).

Habitat
Paraflabellina ischitana usually can be found in shallow water, but it can also reach depths of  35 m.

Description
This species can grow to a length of approximately 4 cm and is mostly purple-violet in colour. It has opaque white-tipped certa, rhinophores, and oral tentacles. The rhinophores are annulate. Due to the somewhat transparent skin of the ceras, the branches of the digestive gland are visible, and appear as red-orange.

Similar species
Paraflabellina ischitana is often confused with Flabellina affinis, but can be distinguished as follows:

Paraflabellina ischitana: the ceratal surface has no purple-violet colouration and is translucent;
Flabellina affinis: the digestive gland is not visible as the area beneath the subapical white ring is opaque;

Paraflabellina ischitana is also similar to Edmundsella pedata, but they can be distinguished on the basis of their rhinophores:

Paraflabellina ischitana has annulate rhinophore
Edmundsella pedata has smooth or papillate rhinophores

Biology
This nudibranch likely eats  hydroids of the genus Eudendrium (Eudendrium racemosum and Eudendrium glomeratum) as its main food source.

Like other nudibranchs, this species is hermaphrodite. Mating occurs in late spring. The egg case is whitish or reddish, with thousands of eggs of about 70 microns. The nudibranch places the egg case on the branches of hydrozoa.

Bibliography 
 Egidio Trainito, Nudibranchi del Mediterraneo. Guida al riconoscimento dei molluschi opistobranchi, 2005ª ed., Milano, Il Castello, 2005, .
 Gary R. McDonald, University of California Santa Cruz - Nudibranch Systematic Index, University of California Santa Cruz - Institute of Marine Sciences

References

External links
 
 

Flabellinidae
Gastropods described in 1990